Tiger Group is a real estate development company based in Dubai, United Arab Emirates. The primary activities of Tiger Group include real estate, industrial production, contracting, commerce, travel, hotels, and education. Its primary focus is real estate, with more than 200 projects totaling 23,000 units. The Company operates in the Persian Gulf countries, the Middle East, and Turkey.

History
Tiger Group was established in 1976, as Tiger Properties by Eng. Walid Mohammad Al-Zoubi. Initially focused on project construction and real estate development, the company later expanded into manufacturing, facilities management, hospitality industry, health care, and education. The company has operations in the Persian Gulf countries, the Middle East, and Turkey.

Tiger Group established four factories in the Emirate of Sharjah, UAE, in 1998: the carpentry and furniture factory, the aluminum and glazing factory, the kitchens factory, and the marble factory, to produce and manufacture a variety of furniture, aluminum, joinery, and marble items.

In 2018 Tiger Group named the "Best Expatriate Friendly Developer" in the Asiavision Excellence Awards.

Tiger Group launched a new project, the Cloud Tower, in Dubai in March 2022, with an investment of $109 million (400 million dirhems). The organization donated 1.6 million AED to the "1 Billion Meals initiative" in April 2022.

Operations
Tiger Contracting is a Tiger Group subsidiary that provides the construction of real estate projects. Major properties of Tiger Group are Seslia Tower, Regina Tower, Blue Waves Tower, The Trio 2 Tower, Al Rasheed 3 Tower, Al Rasheed 4 Tower, Samaya Wadi Al Safa, Al Manara Tower, Al-Jawhara Tower, etc.

Contracting projects of Tiger Group include El Jeel Tower, Al Qoma Tower, El Bait Motawhed, Hafet 2 Tower, Al Rahman Mosque, King Khalid University, Opal Tower, Marina Sail, Safia Tower, etc.

Tiger Group has 4 health clubs and holds the Samaya Hotel Deira in Dubai (Deira, Dubai).

Affiliations
Tiger Group has the affiliations listed below:

References

External links

1976 establishments in the United Arab Emirates
Organizations established in 1976
Business organisations based in the United Arab Emirates
Companies of the United Arab Emirates
Real estate and property developers
Organisations based in Dubai